Axiom of Choice is a southern California (United States) based world music group of Iranian émigrés who perform a modernized fusion style rooted in Persian classical music with inspiration from other classical Middle Eastern and Eastern paradigms.

History
Led by Loga Ramin Torkian, who plays a variant of a guitar of his own invention that is fretted to play quarter tones, the band has a sound combining soaring female vocals, Persian rhythms and melodies, and progressive Western production styles.

The band was named after the mathematical concept, the axiom of choice.

The melodies and rhythms of Persia's radif tradition are mixed with various Middle Eastern and Eastern motifs as well as subtle electronic instrumentation. Led by Iranian-born nylon-string classical guitar, quarter-tone guitar, and tarbass player and musical director Loga Ramin Torkian, the septet  incorporates a global range of influences into its sound. Axiom of Choice remains rooted in the musical heritage of Torkian and fellow Persian émigrés Mamak Khadem and Pejman Hadadi. While Khadem's singing in the Persian language retains the spirit of the past, the playing of Hadadi, one of the leading Persian percussionists living in the United States, gives the group its flavor. Hadadi—who plays daf, tombak, and nagada—previously toured with Hossein Alizadeh, Kayhan Kalhor, and Shahram Nazeri. He continues to be involved with Axiom of Choice and with the Dastan ensemble.

Discography 
Beyond Denial (Faray-e Enkaar) (1996)
Niya Yesh (2000)
Unfolding (Goshayesh) (2002)

See also
Niyaz (similar band)

References

External links
 Official webpage at Xdot25 Music
 [ Axiom of Choice] on Allmusic
 Axiom of Choice on culturebase.net

Persian classical music groups